Anil Koul (born 1 June 1972) is a scientist and former Director of the CSIR-Institute of Microbial Technology (IMTECH), a premier biomedical and biotechnology research institution under Council of Scientific and Industrial Research (CSIR) under Ministry of Science and Technology, Govt. of India.

Anil is currently a member of scientific advisory board of CSIR, a high powered committee for scientific management of CSIR organization, chaired by principal scientific adviser to the Prime Minister, Prof. Vijay Raghavan.

Anil has more than 18 years of pharmaceutical R&D expertise and currently is vice president and Head of Global Public Health discovery at Johnson & Johnson (J&J). He is member of Board of Directors of Janssen Pharmaceutica NV, the European subsidiary of J&J.

Additionally, Anil was recently appointed as Professor of Translational Discovery at London School of Hygiene and Tropical Medicine (LSHTM), where he will set up a laboratory of Translational drug discovery.

Anil's major scientific career achievement is his key role in discovery and development of new tuberculosis drug Bedaquiline - the first drug to be approved in the last 45 years for treatment of drug-resistant tuberculosis.

Early life and education 
Anil was born in Srinagar, Kashmir and completed his secondary school education in Srinagar till 1990 and further Bachelor's and master's degrees from Delhi University. Anil obtained his PhD at Delhi University and at Max-Planck Institute (MPI) of Biochemistry in Germany in 2001. His initial research focused on kinase and phosphatase in the laboratory of Axel Ullrich at MPI and subsequently in Axxima Pharmaceuticals, a biotech company in Munich. In 2004, Anil joined the US multinational Johnson & Johnson, He worked as senior director and headed its respiratory infections discovery unit based in Europe and US. In late 2016, Anil moved to India to run the CSIR-IMTECH in Chandigarh.

Scientific contributions 
Anil's key achievement has been as one of the core scientist at J&J involved in discovery of multi drug-resistant tuberculosis  drug called Bedaquiline. Bedaquiline has been conditionally approved in US, Europe and several high TB burden countries like India, China and South Africa. In 2013, the World Health Organization (WHO) put Bedaquiline on list of its Essential Medicines. Bedaquiline received a prestigious Prix Galien Award for most innovative Orphan Drug (UK) in 2016. In 2019, India's Health Ministry made Bedaquiline available across more than 500 Drug-resistant TB centers in India to help India's #EndTB program. Till date, Bedaquiline has been approved for use in more than 60 countries and is part of national TB eradication plans across the world. In 2020, US FDA approved New Pediatric formulation of Bedaquiline (>=5 years).

Anil has extensive scientific contributions to drug discovery and translational research. Anil and his team have discovered more than 3 other drug candidates, two of which are into late stage human testing including one for serious respiratory viral infections (RSV). Anil has several publications in leading journals like Nature and Science and more than 25 international patents to his credit.

As Director IMTECH he oversaw R&D and non R&D staff of more than 350 people and was responsible for scientific strategy, finance, general administration, business development, procurement, communication & public relations. At IMTECH, Anil played a pivotal role in establishing new research divisions like medicinal chemistry, and virology centers. He established several industry-academia partnerships like Zydus Cadila and a high end skill development centre in partnership with MERCK. In 2018, IMTECH's Bioinformatics Unit was among top institutions in world in number of biological databases. Anil made policy changes including 'ease of doing science' and a new centralized admin block.

Anil has played key roles in several high level government committees like:

 Member, CSIR healthcare theme directorate.
 Technical advisory group member at ICMR National Virtual Centres for Clinical Pharmacology.
 Technical advisory committee member on National Antimicrobial Resistance Program.

Key awards and honors 
In 2020, American Chemical Society (ACS) awarded Anil along with two of his colleagues the  'Heroes of Chemistry Award' for the discovery of Bedaquiline. ACS is one of the biggest non-profit organization chartered by the US Congress. In 2017, Anil was conferred with 'Sun Pharma Science Foundation Award' by India's Health Minister for his contribution to discovery of Bedaquiline. He was also awarded with the 'Swiss-TB Award' (2005) by the Swiss Foundation for Pneumology Research and Johnson Medal (2013). He has featured in Voice of America's (VOI) radio news analysis and India's electronic news channels (NDTV) 'Every Life Counts Program'.

Key Advisory Boards Membership 

 Scientific Advisory Board Member, CSIR.
Research Council Member of CSIR-Central Drug Research Institute, Lucknow.
Board of Directors, Technology Business Incubator, Kalinga Institute of Industrial Technology, Bhubaneswar.
Member of Board of Directors, Janssen Pharmaceuticals NV, Belgium.

References

1972 births
Delhi University alumni
Indian pharmacologists
Living people